Glenea gabonica is a species of beetle in the family Cerambycidae. It was described by James Thomson in 1858. It is known from the Democratic Republic of the Congo, Cameroon, and Gabon. It contains the varietas Glenea gabonica var. cana.

References

gabonica
Beetles described in 1858